Bombie may refer to:

Chiefs of Clan Maclellan
Any of a number of chiefs of Clan MacLellan:
Thomas Maclellan of Bombie
Patrick Maclellan of Bombie

Other
 Bombie the Zombie, a fictional character in the Scrooge McDuck universe
 Mother Bombie, the main character in the Elizabethan era stage play of the same name

See also

 Bomby